John Mark David Hughes (13 December 1978 – 29 June 2014) was a British Anglican theologian and Dean of Chapel and Chaplain at Jesus College, Cambridge. 
He is known for his works on philosophy of religion.

Hughes was born in 1978 in Exeter, England. He was ordained as a deacon of the Church of England in 2005 and as a priest in 2006.

He was killed in a car crash in Cambridgeshire in 2014, aged 35. The John Hughes Arts Festival, founded by college students in 2014 in memory of Hughes, provides a broad programme of arts events.

Books
 The End of Work: Theological Critiques of Capitalism. Malden, Massachusetts: Blackwell Publishing. 2007. .
 Graced Life: The Writings of John Hughes (1979–2014). Edited by Bullimore, Matthew. London: SCM Press. 2016. .

References

1978 births
2014 deaths
21st-century English Anglican priests
21st-century Church of England clergy
21st-century British theologians
Alumni of Emmanuel College, Cambridge
Alumni of Jesus College, Cambridge
Alumni of Merton College, Oxford
Anglo-Catholic clergy
Anglo-Catholic socialists
Anglo-Catholic theologians
British Anglican theologians
British Anglo-Catholics
British Christian socialists
Christian socialist theologians
Church of England priests
Fellows of Jesus College, Cambridge
Philosophers of religion
Religious studies scholars
Road incident deaths in England